The 2008 Scottish Liberal Democrats leadership election was an election to choose a new leader of the Liberal Democrats in Scotland, triggered following the resignation of Nicol Stephen for personal reasons. Deputy leader Michael Moore (MP for Berwickshire, Roxburgh and Selkirk) took over as interim party leader, and the timetable for the election was agreed on 5 July 2008: Nominations closed on 24 July 2008, the return of the ballot papers was set for 26 August 2008 and the declaration of results occurred on the same date. The last leadership election was held in 2005 after the resignation of Jim Wallace, when Stephen defeated Mike Rumbles.

Candidates

Successfully nominated candidates
The following MSPs gained the required one nomination from a fellow MSP, and were therefore candidates for the leadership:

Mike Rumbles - MSP for West Aberdeenshire and Kincardine
Tavish Scott - MSP for Shetland and former transport minister
Ross Finnie MSP for West of Scotland regional list and former environment minister

Suggested candidates
Jeremy Purvis - MSP for Tweeddale, Ettrick and Lauderdale, had also been considered to be a possible contender, but he declined to run after Scott and Finnie announced their candidacies.

Result
The result of the leadership election was announced on 26 August 2008; turnout was 61%.

References

Scottish Liberal Democrats leadership election
2000s elections in Scotland
Scottish Liberal Democrats leadership election
2008
Scottish Liberal Democrats leadership election